Beijing Jingkelong Supermarket Chain Company Limited or Jingkelong (JKL;) is a Chinese supermarket chain headquartered in Chaoyang District, Beijing.

As of 2015 it operates 280 retail outlets; including hypermarkets, supermarkets, convenience stores, and shopping centers; in Beijing and in Langfang, Hebei. The chain operates retail centers in 16 districts and counties in Beijing and Langfang.

In 2007 it was the 27th largest retailer in China.

History

Beijing Guandongdian Shangsha (北京关东店商厦) was established in 1994, and the first chain store, Jingkelong Jingsong supermarket (京客隆劲松商城), opened in 1995. In 2002 Beijing Jingkelong Supermarket Chain Company Limited (北京京客隆超市连锁有限公司) was established, renaming itself to Beijing Jingkelong Supermarket Chain Group Company Limited (北京京客隆超市连锁集团有限公司) the same year. In 2004 the company renamed itself to Beijing Jingkelong Company Limited  (北京京客隆商业集团股份有限公司) after reorganizing its assets.

In 2006 it made its second IPO attempt. Its first day of trading on the HKSE was September 25, 2006, and its shares went up 22% that day.

After its listing, it acquired eight stores from the Fulande retail chain. In 2007 it paid 50 million yuan to purchase an 11% stake in Shoulian.

See also

 Wumart, one of Jingkelong's competitors

References

External links
 Jingkelong
 Jingkelong 

Companies based in Beijing
Supermarkets of China
Companies listed on the Hong Kong Stock Exchange